Ghunghat (also spelled Ghoonghat) is an Urdu language Pakistani film released in the summer of 1996. It marked Shaan's comeback into the Pakistani film industry and won the actor many plaudits for his performance as the scheming villain. 

It is directed by Syed Noor and produced by Shahzad Rafique. Pakistani singer Fariha Pervez dubbed Andaleeb's character in the film on the request of the director Syed Noor.

Cast
 Mohsin Khan 
 Andaleeb 
 Shaan 
 Resham  
 Arbaaz Khan

Film's soundtrack
 Ghunghat's music  soundtrack is composed by Amjad Bobby. A number of the film's songs became hits, some before the film was even released.

Awards
 Nigar Award for Best Supporting Actress in 1996
 Nigar Award for Best Music Director in 1996
 Nigar Award for Best Song Writer in 1996
 Nigar Award for Best Male Singer in 1996

References

External links

1996 films
1990s Urdu-language films
Films scored by Amjad Bobby
Pakistani romantic thriller films
Films directed by Syed Noor
Nigar Award winners
Urdu-language Pakistani films